A

The list of current and past Rajya Sabha members from the Punjab, India. The state elects 7 members for a term of 6 years. The members are indirectly elected by the state legislators, as done since 1952.

List of Current Members of Rajya Sabha from Punjab

List of Former Members of Rajya Sabha from Punjab (Since 1952)
^ - Incumbent Member of Parliament

List of Former Members of Rajya Sabha from erstwhile PEPSU (1952-1956)

Notes

References

External links
Official Website of Rajya Sabha

Punjab, India
 
Rajya Sabha